Clarkson is a town in Kou-Kamma Local Municipality in the Eastern Cape province of South Africa.

Moravian Mission village in the former Humansdorp district, 26 km south-east of Assegaaibos station and 60 km west of Humansdorp. A mission station was established by Bishop Hans Peter Hallbeck in 1839 and named after Thomas Clarkson who helped abolish the slave-trade.

References

Populated places in the Kou-Kamma Local Municipality